Igal is a town in Somogy county, Hungary. Igal is 43 km south of Zamárdi. Igal Spa has 12 pools with adventure elements.

External links 
 Street map (Hungarian)

References 

Populated places in Somogy County